The 1942 Fort Knox Armoraiders football team represented Fort Knox during the 1942 college football season. The Armoraiders compiled a 2–6 record against a diverse schedule of major and small colleges, and military service squads. They also played a in a mid-season exhibition game against the Pittsburgh Steelers of the National Football League (NFL). The team was led by head coach Joe Bach, who had previously coached at Niagara University. On November 15, the Armoraiders faced off against Steelers in a charity game for the USO, marking a rare occasion of a professional football team playing against a non-professional one.

Schedule

References

 
Fort Knox
Fort Knox Armoraiders football seasons
Fort Knox Armoraiders football